Miladinovi Islets (Miladinovi Ostrovi \mi-la-'di-no-vi 'o-stro-vi\) is a group of two small rocky islands,  (surface area ), and  respectively, situated  south of Iratais Point on Desolation Island off the north coast of Livingston Island, Antarctica.  The islands are separated from Desolation Island by Neck or Nothing Passage.  The area was frequented by early nineteenth century English and American sealers operating from the adjacent Blythe Bay.

Named after the Bulgarian poets and folklorists Dimitar Miladinov (1810–62) and Konstantin Miladinov (1830–62), popular as ‘Miladinovi Brothers’.

See also 
 Composite Antarctic Gazetteer
 List of Antarctic islands south of 60° S
 SCAR
 Territorial claims in Antarctica

Maps
 L.L. Ivanov et al., Antarctica: Livingston Island and Greenwich Island, South Shetland Islands (from English Strait to Morton Strait, with illustrations and ice-cover distribution), Scale 1:100000 map, Antarctic Place-names Commission of Bulgaria, Ministry of Foreign Affairs, Sofia, 2005
 L.L. Ivanov. Antarctica: Livingston Island and Smith Island. Scale 1:100000 topographic map. Manfred Wörner Foundation, 2017.

Notes

References
 Miladinovi Islets. SCAR Composite Antarctic Gazetteer
 Bulgarian Antarctic Gazetteer. Antarctic Place-names Commission. (details in Bulgarian, basic data in English)

External links
 Miladinovi Islets. Copernix satellite image

Islands of Livingston Island
Bulgaria and the Antarctic